Société Nationale Petrolière Gabonaise (SNPG) was the national petroleum company of Gabon.

SNGP was founded in 1979 and disbanded in 1987. The country had no national petroleum company until the Gabon Oil Company was established in June 2011.

Operations
The government of Gabon controls petroleum and mineral rights within the state. Gabon's oil reserves are onshore, shallow water and deep water exploration blocks and working fields.

Among the companies involved in contractual oil and gas work in Gabon are Africa Energy, Shell, Elf Gabon/TotalFinaElf, Vaalco Energy and Agip Gabon/ENI.

Crudes:
Rabi Light
Mandji Blend

Major oil fields and operators:
Atora Field Elf Gabon
Gamba Field
Limande Field ENI
Rabi-Kounga Field Shell

In 1996 Gabon resigned from OPEC, stating that membership in the group was disadvantageous to its oil industry.

Société Gabonaise de Raffinage, known as Sogara, operates an oil refinery in Port Gentil.

See also

 Energy in Gabon

References

External links
Alexander's Gas and Oil Online:EIA Country Analysis: Gabon
MBendi:Gabon:Oil and Gas
MBendi:Sogara

Oil and gas companies of Gabon
Government-owned companies of Gabon
Gabon